= O2 World =

O2 World may refer to:

- O2 World Berlin, currently known as Uber Arena
- O2 World Hamburg, currently known as Barclaycard Arena
